Isaac Moses (1742? – 16 April 1818) was a Jewish merchant who helped establish the Bank of North America in 1781.

References

Further reading

 

18th-century American businesspeople
19th-century American businesspeople
1742 births
1818 deaths
Colonial American merchants
American Jews